Sathivayal is a tiny hamlet in Viralimalai Taluk in Pudukkottai District, Tamil Nadu, India.  The village has a total population of about 300.  Most of them originated from two families that arrived and established this village during the 1830s; the area was uninhabited until their arrival.  All residents in the village belong to the caste Parkavakulam.  The village has one government school which serves students through the fifth grade.

Sathivayal is surrounded by the following villages: Peraambur, Amboorpatti, Mathayanaipatii and Villaarodai.  Sathivayal have   Government Bus facility from the year 2017. The bus facility is available to Trichy. The village is pleasant and looks good. The main occupation of the people is Agriculture. The village is under Viralimalai legislative assembly and Karur lok sabha constituency. The village have a vast agricultural fields. The village have three Hindu temples and one church. The major population in the village is Hindus and some of Christians live in this Village.

Aerial photos & maps
http://www.wikimapia.org/#lat=10.628427&lon=78.6526626&z=18&l=0&m=a&v=2&search=sathivayal

Villages in Pudukkottai district